Isaac Fraser (September 19, 1779 – July 2, 1858) was a political figure in Upper Canada.

Early Years
He was born in Albany County, New York in 1779. He settled on a farm in Ernestown Township, served in the militia during the War of 1812 and became a colonel in the Addington Militia.

Politics
He represented Lennox & Addington in the Legislative Assembly of Upper Canada from 1816 to 1820 and served as members of the Executive Council and Legislative Council of Upper Canada from 1839 to 1841. He was appointed as justice of the peace in the Midland District in 1818.

Personal

His daughter Eleanor Fraser married Aylesworth Bowen Perry, Commissioner of the Northwest Mounted Police 1900 to 1920 and Commissioner of the Royal Canadian Mounted Police 1920 to 1923.

References 
 ''Becoming Prominent: Regional leadership in Upper Canada, 1791–1841. J.K. Johnson (1989)

1779 births
1858 deaths
Members of the Legislative Council of Upper Canada
Members of the Legislative Assembly of Upper Canada
People from Albany County, New York
American emigrants to pre-Confederation Ontario
British people of the War of 1812
People from Lennox and Addington County
Immigrants to Upper Canada